Maiju Gebhard (September 15, 1896, in Helsinki – July 18, 1986, in Helsinki) was a Finnish inventor who invented the dish drying cabinet as  the head of the household department at the Finnish Work Efficiency Institute in between 1944 and 1945. She was a daughter of economist Hannes Gebhard and politician Hedvig Gebhard.

References 

1896 births
1986 deaths
Finnish inventors
People from Helsinki